Andrew Francis Harrington (November 13, 1888 – November 12, 1938) was a professional baseball pitcher who played in one game for the Cincinnati Reds on September 8, .

External links

1888 births
1938 deaths
Cincinnati Reds players
Major League Baseball pitchers
Baseball players from Massachusetts
Eau Claire Commissioners players
Lynn Shoemakers players